United States gubernatorial elections were held November 8, 1977, in two states and two territories.

Election results

References

 
November 1977 events in the United States